The Bravo Award was an annual award which was handed out by the Italian magazine Guerin Sportivo to the most outstanding young European footballer.

The first winner of the award was Englishman Jimmy Case. The first non-European to win the award was the Brazilian Ronaldo in 1997.

The award was discontinued after the 2015 edition.

History and regulations
In 1977, Guerin Sportivo's editorial staff established the award to celebrate the best young footballers in European football. The jury was composed by Guerin Sportivo'''s and Radiocorriere TV''s journalist as well as foreign sports journalists from the most important news outlets across Europe.

Since the inception and until 1992, only under-23 players participating in one of the three European club cups (UEFA Champions League, UEFA Cup, UEFA Cup Winners' Cup) were eligible. The rules changed in 1992, when under-21 player from any European League became eligible, regardless of their participation in any European club cups.

The winners were chosen for the autumn-spring season, not the calendar year.

List of winners

See also 
 Golden Boy (award)

References

External links 
 Bravo Award at RSSSF.com

European football trophies and awards
Awards by magazines